The de la Bere Baronetcy, of Crowborough in the County of Sussex, was a title in the Baronetage of the United Kingdom. It was created on 18 November 1953 for Rupert de la Bere, Conservative Member of Parliament for Evesham and South Worcestershire and Lord Mayor of London. He was descended from the de La Bere family of Southam de la Bere in Gloucestershire. The baronetcy became extinct on the death of the 3rd baronet, who never proved his succession, on 10 February 2017.

De la Bere baronets, of Crowborough (1953)
Sir Rupert de la Bere, 1st Baronet (1893–1978)
Sir Cameron de la Bere, 2nd Baronet (1933–2014)
Sir Adrian de la Bere, 3rd Baronet (1939–2017)

Notes

References
Kidd, Charles, Williamson, David (editors). Debrett's Peerage and Baronetage (1990 edition). New York: St Martin's Press, 1990, 

De la Bere